Palestine Is Still the Issue is a 2002 Carlton Television documentary, written and presented by John Pilger, and directed by Tony Stark, inspired by the book Drinking The Sea at Gaza by Amira Haas.  Pilger visits the Middle East and tries to discover why peace is elusive.

Synopsis
Pilger returns to the Occupied Territories of the West Bank and Gaza where he filmed a documentary with the same title in 1977. He believes the basic problems are unchanged: a desperate, destitute people whose homeland is illegally occupied by the world's 19th largest military power. The majority of the film is dedicated to interviewing Israelis, some of them settlers or advisers for the government, others Israelis who are critical towards the politics of their government. However, the film also takes time to speak with many Palestinians and goes into depth as to explain to Western audiences why the Palestinians feel that they have to keep resisting the occupation of the "territories" and fight back against the blockade of the Gaza Strip.

Interviewees
Dr. Mustafa Barghouthi – Union of Palestinian Medical Relief Committees
Professor Ilan Pappe – Israeli Historian
Liana Badr – Director, Palestinian Ministry of Culture
Dori Gold – Senior Adviser to the Israeli Prime Minister
Moshe Dann – Israeli writer
Dr. Khaled Dahlan – Gaza Community Health Project
Dr. Mona Al Farra – Palestinian doctor
Ishay Rosen-Zvi – former Israeli soldier
Lama Hourani – Palestinian resident, Gaza
Amjad Abu Laban – Palestinian resident, Bethlehem
David Reisch – Israeli settler
Rami Elhanan -– Israeli peace activist 
Fatima Abed-Rabo
Khalil Idris

Reception
The film was criticised by Michael Green, chairman of Carlton Communications, the company that made the film, as being inaccurate and biased.
The next day, under the headline 'Carlton rebukes own chairman for attacking documentary', the Independent published a statement by Carlton's Director of Factual Programmes, Richard Clemmow, and Executive Producer Polly Bide. "Carlton stands by John Pilger's programme and its accuracy" it read. "The film went through the normal channels of editorial scrutiny prior to completion and senior executives at both Carlton and the ITV Network Centre approved its transmission. Michael Green's opinion is his own. He had no involvement in the programme or its transmission. The film sought to give a voice to people in the Palestinian and Israeli communities who are seldom heard"

Awards and festival screenings
 The Chris Award, Columbus International Film & Video Festival
 Best of Category, Vermont International Film Festival
 Certificate of Merit, Chicago International Television Awards
 Mountaintop Film Festival, Vermont
 Istanbul International Labor Film Festival

External links

References

2002 television films
2002 documentary films
2002 films
British television documentaries
Documentary films about the Israeli–Palestinian conflict
Documentary films presented by John Pilger
2000s British films